Events from the year 1683 in Ireland.

Incumbent
Monarch: Charles II

Events
February 19 – the Evans Baronetcy, of Kilcreene in the County of Kilkenny, is created in the Baronetage of Ireland in favour of William Evans.
June 23 – the Caldwell Baronetcy of Wellsborough in County Fermanagh, is created in the Baronetage of Ireland in favour of James Caldwell, High Sheriff of County Fermanagh.
October 15 – first meeting of the Dublin Philosophical Society, established by William Molyneux.
December 14 – Dominic Maguire, O.P., is elected as Roman Catholic Archbishop of Armagh and Primate of All Ireland by the Sacred Congregation for the Propagation of the Faith.
The titles of Viscount Mountjoy and Baron Stewart of Ramelton in the Peerage of Ireland are conferred upon Sir William Stewart, 3rd Baronet, of Ramelton.

Births

October 25 – Charles FitzRoy, 2nd Duke of Grafton, Lord Lieutenant of Ireland (d. 1757)
Daniel Falkiner, politician (d. 1759)
Thomas Fortescue, politician (d. 1769)
Michael Ward, politician (d. 1759)

Deaths
February 3 – Randal MacDonnell, 1st Marquess of Antrim, Roman Catholic landowner in Ireland and Scotland and political intriguer (b. 1609)
November 28 – Valentine Greatrakes, faith healer (b. 1628)
December 11 – George Lane, 1st Viscount Lanesborough, politician (b. c.1620)
Charles Kirkhoven, 1st Earl of Bellomont, Dutch-born peer (b. 1643)

References

 
1680s in Ireland
Ireland
Years of the 17th century in Ireland